David Tanner may refer to:

 David Tanner (cyclist) (born 1984), Australian road cyclist
 Sir David Tanner (rowing) (born 1947), performance director for the British Rowing Team
 David B. Tanner, American physicist